Daniel Webster Hering (23 March 1850 – 24 March 1938) was an American physicist and university dean.

Biography

Hering was born near Smithburg in Washington County, Maryland, and graduated from the Sheffield Scientific School (Yale) with a Ph.B. in 1872.  He occupied positions at Johns Hopkins University, McDaniel College (then Western Maryland College), the University of Pittsburgh (then the Western University of Pennsylvania), and New York University, where he was dean after 1902.  He was the author of Essentials of Physics for College Students (1912). Hering is credited with taking the first human x-ray in the United States on February 5, 1896, at Bellevue Hospital.

Foibles and Fallacies of Science

Hering's work Foibles and Fallacies of Science (1924) is considered one of the key original texts on matters concerning pseudoscience. The book was positively reviewed in the Nature journal as containing much "curious and interesting information." The book covered alchemy, astrology, divination, prophecies, perpetual motion devices, hoaxes and quackery.

A review in the Journal of Pharmaceutical Sciences described it as a "serious study of pseudoscience" intended for the "layman in science and the professional student to whom we can highly recommend it."

Hering was one of the original citations for Martin Gardner in his work Fads and Fallacies in the Name of Science in which it is argued that he founded the modern scientific skepticism movement.

Selected publications

Essentials of Physics for College Students (1912, 1921)
Physics: The Science of the Forces of Nature (1922)
Foibles and Fallacies Of Science (1924)

References

External links
 

1850 births
1938 deaths
American skeptics
American physicists
Critics of parapsychology
People from Washington County, Maryland
Rationalists
Yale School of Engineering & Applied Science alumni
Johns Hopkins University faculty
University of Pittsburgh faculty
New York University faculty